Forbes magazine annually ranks the world's wealthiest female billionaires. This list uses the static rating published once a year by Forbes, usually in March. There were 328 women listed on the world's billionaires , up from 241 in March 2020. Since 2021, Francoise Bettencourt Meyers is listed as the world's wealthiest woman.

According to a 2021 billionaire census, women make up 11.9% of the billionaire cohort, and "just over half of all female billionaires are heiresses, with an additional 30% having a combination of inherited and created wealth." In the overall female billionaire cohort, 16.9% of billionaires are "self-made" and 53.5% gained their wealth through a combination of inheritance and "self-made" wealth as of 2017.

2021 list
In January 2021, CEOWORLD Magazine announced that if her family's wealth is included in her total fortune, then Francoise Bettencourt Meyers's wealth is estimated to stand at $71.4 billion.

The top 10 women billionaires, using the Forbes static ranking , are:

2020 list
The top 10 women billionaires, using the Forbes static ranking , are:

See also
 Forbes list of billionaires
 Forbes' list of The World's 100 Most Powerful Women
 The Giving Pledge

References

 
Billionaires
Female